Tetradactylus fitzsimonsi, commonly known as Fitzsimons's long-tailed seps, is a species of lizard in the family Gerrhosauridae.
The species is endemic to South Africa.

References

Tetradactylus
Reptiles described in 1915
Fauna of South Africa
Taxa named by John Hewitt (herpetologist)